Events from the 1310s in Denmark.

Incumbents 
 Monarch – Eric VI of Denmark (until 1319)

Events 
1316
 August  The Battle of Gransee is fought in August 1316 between the armies of a North German-Danish alliance led by the Duchy of Mecklenburg, and those of the Margraviate of Brandenburg and their allies.

1317
 25 November – the Treaty of Templin is signed, ending a war between the Margraviate of Brandenburg and the kingdom of Denmark.
 Undated  Horsens is incorporated as a market town.

Births 
 c. 1319 – Otto, Duke of Lolland and Estonia, prince of Denmark (died 1346)
 1374 – Valdemar III of Denmark (died 1364)

Deaths 
 1310 – Eric Longlegs, Lord of Langeland (born 1272)
 1312 – Valdemar IV, Duke of Schleswig (born c. 1262)
 1319  Ingeborg Magnusdotter of Sweden (born c. 1277 in Sweden)
 13 November 1319 – Eric VI of Denmark (born 1274)

References 

1310s in Denmark